The 2017 CBA Playoffs is the postseason tournament of the Chinese Basketball Association's 2016–17 season.

Bracket
Teams in bold advanced to the next round. The numbers to the left of each team indicate the team's seeding, and the numbers to the right indicate the number of games the team won in that round. Teams with home court advantage are shown in italics.

First round
All times are in China standard time (UTC+8)

(1) Xinjiang Flying Tigers vs. (8) Shandong Golden Stars

(2) Guangdong Southern Tigers vs. (7) Sichuan Blue Whales

(3) Shanghai Sharks vs. (6) Shenzhen Leopards

(4) Zhejiang Lions vs. (5) Liaoning Flying Leopards

Semifinals
All times are in China standard time (UTC+8)

(1) Xinjiang Flying Tigers vs. (5) Liaoning Flying Leopards

(2) Guangdong Southern Tigers vs. (6) Shenzhen Leopards

Finals
All times are in China standard time (UTC+8)

(1) Xinjiang Flying Tigers vs. (2) Guangdong Southern Tigers

References

Chinese Basketball Association playoffs
playoffs